Leif Andersen (born 19 April 1971) is a Norwegian retired professional footballer who played as a defender. He spent most of his career in Norwegian domestic football, but also spent one-and-a-half seasons with English Football League club Crystal Palace.

Playing career
Andersen began his youth career with Rade before signing with Kongsvinger in 1992. In 1993, he moved to Moss FK and in January 1996 signed for English club Crystal Palace, at that time playing in the Football League Championship. He went on to make 16 appearances in the second half of the season without scoring and a further 14 appearances (one goal) in the 1996–97 season, at the end of which Palace were promoted to the Premier League via the play-offs.

However, in May 1997, Andersen returned to Moss FK, where he made 38 appearances over the next two years, scoring twice. He then moved to Sarpsborg FK in 1999, before joining Rygge IL in 2001 and Østsiden IL in 2003 where he finished his senior career.

References

External links

Leif Andersen at holmesdale.net

1971 births
Living people
Sportspeople from Fredrikstad
Norwegian footballers
Association football defenders
English Football League players
Kongsvinger IL Toppfotball players
Crystal Palace F.C. players
Moss FK players
Sarpsborg FK players
Eliteserien players
Norwegian First Division players
Expatriate footballers in England
Norwegian expatriate footballers
Norwegian expatriate sportspeople in England